Bela keepingi is an extinct species of sea snail, a marine gastropod mollusk in the family Mangeliidae.

Description
The length of the shell attains 6.6 mm, its diameter 2.2 mm.

Distribution
This extinct marine species was found in the Pliocene and Pleistocene strata in  Cornwall, Great Britain, and in Belgium

References

 Etheridge, R. & Bell, A., 1898. On the pliocene beds at St. Erth. Transactions of the Geological Society of Cornwall, 12: 111-166.

External links
 Image of Bela keepingi

keepingi